Twentynine Palms, California is a town in San Bernardino County, California.

Twentynine Palms may also refer to:
 Twentynine Palms (film), a 2003 film
 29 Palms (film), a 2002 crime film
 Marine Corps Air Ground Combat Center Twentynine Palms, a United States Marine Corps camp
 "29 Palms" (song),  a 1993 song by Robert Plant
 Twenty-Nine Palms Band of Mission Indians of California, a federally recognized tribe